J6 may refer to:

Vehicles
 Junkers J 6, a German fighter aircraft
 Shenyang J-6, Chinese version of Soviet MiG-19 jet fighter
 Aerolimousine, a Russian airline
 HMS J6, a World War I UK submarine sunk in a friendly fire incident
 HMS Alresford, a UK minesweeper, pennant number J06
 MGWR Class J6, successor to the MGWR Class H steam locomotive
 LNER Class J6, a class of British steam locomotives

Other uses
 J6, an abbreviation for the January 6th United States Capitol attack
 J6, The United States House Select Committee on the January 6 Attack
 J6 hearings – Public hearings of the United States House Select Committee on the January 6 Attack
 Justice for J6 rally, related event
 J6, the ITU prefix for the island country of Saint Lucia
 J06, one of the ICD-10 upper respiratory tract infection codes (J00-06)
 ATC code J06 Immune sera and immunoglobulins, a subgroup of the Anatomical Therapeutic Chemical Classification System
 Joint Staff J-6, a directorate of the US Department of Defense
 pentagonal rotunda, a Johnson solid in geometry
 Samsung Galaxy J6, an Android mobile phone
 Judgement Six (J6), an evil organization from the video game series Virtua Fighter